Chidira is a village on the Greek island of Lesbos (or Lesvos), located at its western part and belonging to the municipal unit of Eresos-Antissa. Its population was 472 in 2011. Chidira borders with the villages Agra, Mesotopos, Eresos, Antissa, Revma, Pterounda and Vatousa.

Chidira is the birthplace of Georgios Jakobides or Iakovidis, one of the most important Greek painters. The Jacobides Digital Museum is located in Chidira.

A prehistoric site
A prehistoric site is on top of the hill Koirania, right above the village. The site has not been excavated yet, but the dating of artifacts found there, including a stone phallus exhibited at Methymneos Winery (see below), indicate that it dates back to the beginning of the 5th millennium B.C.

Environment
The crater of the volcano which formed the Petrified Forest of Lesbos is located in the area. The soil is therefore very acidic and contains many minerals, including sulfur and copper sulfate. Vegetation consists of Mediterranean shrubs, oak-trees and several species of waterplants at the banks of the numerous streams. The area harbors the only European colony of the plant "Rhododendron luteum", which favors the acidic soil. Furthermore, the region of Chidira is a wildlife sanctuary and a nature reserve, owing to its abundant fauna and its distinct geological features and flora.

Wine-making area

Methymneos Winery, owned by Ioannis Lambrou, is located in Chidira. The winery produces organic wines made exclusively with the Chidiriotiko grape variety of Lesbos. The acidic, sulfuric soil of Chidira gives Methymnaeos wines a strong minerality and prevents vine diseases, thus favoring organic farming. Methymneos is the first commercial bottled wine in the history of the renowned ancient Lesbian wine. Tours to the winery, offered every year in July, August and September by the owner himself, are free of charge.

References

Populated places in Lesbos